Don Watson (27 August 1932 – June 2018) was an English professional footballer who played for several clubs in the north of England.

Career statistics

References

1932 births
2018 deaths
English footballers
Association football forwards
Rochdale A.F.C. players
Sheffield Wednesday F.C. players
Lincoln City F.C. players
Bury F.C. players
Barnsley F.C. players
Barrow A.F.C. players
Buxton F.C. players
Worsbrough Bridge Athletic F.C. players